Louvenia Dorsey Bright is an American politician. She served in the Vermont House of Representatives from 1988 to 1994. She is the first elected Black female legislator in Vermont.

She is married to University of Vermont professor William Bright.

References

20th-century American politicians
20th-century American women politicians
Members of the Vermont House of Representatives
Women state legislators in Vermont